Kong Sheng (born 1960) is a Chinese cinematographer, actor and director best known for his directorial works Romance oF Our Parents (2014), All Quiet in Peking (2014), Nirvana in Fire (2015), and Ode to Joy (2016).

Early life and education
Kong was born in Shandong in 1960. After college, he worked in a periodical agency as an editor.

Career
In 1990, Kong Sheng worked as photography assistant in Zhang Xinjian and Liu Ziyun's historical television series Confucus. His 1990s work includes Romance in Manchuria, Story of the Street, Kong Fansen, and Daughter of Ali Mountain.

Kong made his directorial debut Policeman Cheng Guangquan in 1996.

In 1998, he worked with director Sun Bo in Police 110, which won the first prize in the China TV Golden Eagle Awards. That same year, his work The Holy Flame on the Sea won Outstanding Photography at the Flying Apsaras Awards.

In 2006, Kong directed Guandong Adventure,  the series stars Li Youbin, Sa Rina, Song Jia, Zhu Yawen, Niu Li, and Liu Xiangjing. It received mainly positive reviews and won seven awards at the China TV Golden Eagle Awards.

In 2012, he co-directed with Li Xue in Legend of Entrepreneurship, which broadcast in CCTV-1.

In 2013, Kong co-directed with Li Xue again in All Quiet in Peking, which stars Liu Ye, Chen Baoguo, Ni Dahong, Liao Fan, Zu Feng, Dong Yong, and Jiao Huang. The TV drama won several awards, such as Best Television Awards at the 5th Macau International Television Festival and Shanghai Television Festival, and Golden Angel Award at the Chinese-American Film Festival. Kong was awarded the Outstanding Award at the 30th Flying Apsaras Awards.

In 2014, he co-directed with Li Xue in the historical television series Nirvana in Fire. The series stars Hu Ge, Liu Tao and Wang Kai. It won numerous awards, including Flying Apsaras Awards, Macau International Television Festival, China TV Drama Awards, Huading Awards, Shanghai Television Festival, and Golden Eagle Awards.

In 2015, Kong directed Ode to Joy with Jian Chuanhe. The drama received mainly positive reviews and became one of the most watched ones in mainland China in that year.

In 2016, he directed Nirvana in Fire 2 with Li Xue, the sequel to 2014's Nirvana in Fire.

Filmography

As cinematographer

As director

Film and TV Awards

References

External links
 
 
 Kong Sheng on Douban 
 Kong Sheng on Mtime 

1960 births
Male actors from Shandong
Living people
Chinese cinematographers
Chinese television directors
Chinese male television actors